Jorge Segura (born 23 April 1975) is a Mexican male former racewalker. He was the gold medallist at the 1994 World Junior Championships in Athletics. He also won senior gold medals in the 20,000 metres track walk at the 1996 Ibero-American Championships in Athletics and the 20 kilometres race walk at the 1995 Central American and Caribbean Championships in Athletics. He was a four-time participant at the Pan American Race Walking Cup. Segura retired from the sport after 2009.

He holds personal bests of 1:22:53 hours for the 20 km distance and 4:13:54 hours for the 50 kilometres race walk.

Personal bests
10,000 metres race walk – 40:26.93 (1994)
10 kilometres race walk – 41:28 (2005)
20 kilometres race walk – 1:22:53 (2005)
50 kilometres race walk – 4:13:54 (2007)

International competitions

References

1975 births
Living people
Mexican male racewalkers
21st-century Mexican people